The Metropolitan Museum of Art in New York City, colloquially "the Met", is the largest art museum in the Americas and the most-visited museum in the Western Hemisphere. Its permanent collection contains over two million works, divided among 17 curatorial departments. The main building at 1000 Fifth Avenue, along the Museum Mile on the eastern edge of Central Park on Manhattan's Upper East Side, is by area one of the world's largest art museums. The first portion of the approximately  building was built in 1880. A much smaller second location, The Cloisters at Fort Tryon Park in Upper Manhattan, contains an extensive collection of art, architecture, and artifacts from medieval Europe.

The Metropolitan Museum of Art was founded in 1870 with its mission to bring art and art education to the American people. The museum's permanent collection consists of works of art from classical antiquity and ancient Egypt, paintings, and sculptures from nearly all the European Old Masters, and an extensive collection of American and modern art. The Met maintains extensive holdings of African, Asian, Oceanian, Byzantine, and Islamic art. The museum is home to encyclopedic collections of musical instruments, costumes, and accessories, as well as antique weapons and armor from around the world. Several notable interiors, ranging from 1st-century Rome through modern American design, are installed in its galleries.

Collections 
The Met's permanent collection is curated by seventeen separate departments, each with a specialized staff of curators and scholars, as well as six dedicated conservation departments and a Department of Scientific Research. The permanent collection includes works of art from classical antiquity and ancient Egypt, paintings and sculptures from nearly all the European masters; and an extensive collection of American and modern art. The Met maintains extensive holdings of African, Asian, Oceanian, Byzantine, and Islamic art. The museum is also home to encyclopedic collections of musical instruments, costumes and accessories, and antique weapons and armor from around the world. A great number of period rooms, ranging from first-century Rome through modern American design, are permanently installed in the Met's galleries. In addition to its permanent exhibitions, the Met organizes and hosts large traveling shows throughout the year.

Geographically designated collections

Ancient Near Eastern art 
Beginning in the late 19th century, the Met started acquiring ancient art and artifacts from the Near East. From a few cuneiform tablets and seals, the museum's collection of Near Eastern art has grown to more than 7,000 pieces. Representing a history of the region beginning in the Neolithic Period and encompassing the fall of the Sasanian Empire and the end of Late Antiquity, the collection includes works from the Sumerian, Hittite, Sasanian, Assyrian, Babylonian, and Elamite cultures (among others), as well as an extensive collection of unique Bronze Age objects. The highlights of the collection include a set of monumental stone lamassu, or guardian figures, from the Northwest Palace of the Assyrian king Ashurnasirpal II.

Arts of Africa, Oceania, and the Americas 

Though the Met first acquired a group of Peruvian antiquities in 1882, the museum did not begin a concerted effort to collect works from Africa, Oceania, and the Americas until 1969, when American businessman and philanthropist Nelson A. Rockefeller donated his more than 3,000-piece collection to the museum. Before Rockefeller's collection existed at the Met, Rockefeller founded The Museum of Primitive Art in New York City with the intentions of displaying these works, after the Met had previously shown disinterest in his art collection. In 1968, the Met had agreed to a temporary exhibition of Rockefeller's work. However, the Met then requested to include the arts of Africa, Oceania, and the Americas in their personal collection and on permanent display. The arts of Africa, Oceania, and the Americas opened to the public in 1982, under the title, "The Michael C. Rockefeller Wing". This wing is named after Nelson Rockefeller's son, Michael Rockefeller, who died while collecting works in New Guinea.

Today, the Met's collection contains more than 11,000 pieces from sub-Saharan Africa, the Pacific Islands, and the Americas and is housed in the  Rockefeller Wing on the south end of the museum. The Wing exhibits Non-Western works of art created from  – present, while at the same time displays a wide range of cultural histories. This is considered to be the first time arts outside of the West were placed alongside Western art in a Western museum. Before then, the works of art from Africa, Oceania, and the Americas were considered art of the "primitives" or ethnographic objects.

The Wing exhibits the arts of Africa, Oceania, and the Americas in an exhibition separated by geographical locations. The collection ranges from 40,000-year-old indigenous Australian rock paintings, to a group of  memorial poles carved by the Asmat people of New Guinea, to a priceless collection of ceremonial and personal objects from the Nigerian Court of Benin donated by Klaus Perls. The range of materials represented in the Africa, Oceania, and Americas collection is undoubtedly the widest of any department at the Met, including everything from precious metals to porcupine quills. The Michael C. Rockefeller Wing's exhibition space is planned to be renovated between 2020 and 2023.

Curator of African Art Susan Mullin Vogel reported of a famous Benin artefact gained by the Metropolitan Museum of Art in the year of 1972. The item was originally auctioned in April 1900 by a lieutenant named Augustus Pitt Rivers at the price of 37 Guineas.

In December 2021, the Met began its $70 million renovation of the African, ancient American, and Oceanic art galleries, which is set for completion in 2024. Part of this 40,000 square-feet renovation will include the installation of a glass wall to better illuminate the galleries as well as featuring 3,000 new works.

Asian art 

The Met's Asian department holds a collection of Asian art, of more than 35,000 pieces, that is arguably the most comprehensive in the US. The collection dates back almost to the founding of the museum: many of the philanthropists who made the earliest gifts to the museum included Asian art in their collections. Today, an entire wing of the museum is dedicated to the Asian collection, and spans 4,000 years of Asian art. Every known Asian civilization is represented in the Met's Asian department, and the pieces on display include every type of decorative art, from painting and printmaking to sculpture and metalworking. The department is well known for its comprehensive collection of Chinese calligraphy and painting, as well as for its Indian sculptures, Nepalese and Tibetan works, and the arts of Burma (Myanmar), Cambodia and Thailand. Three ancient religions of India—Hinduism, Buddhism and Jainism—are well represented in these sculptures. However, not only "art" and ritual objects are represented in the collection; many of the best-known pieces are functional objects. The Asian wing also contains a complete Ming Dynasty-style garden court, modeled on a courtyard in the Master of the Nets Garden in Suzhou. Maxwell K. Hearn has been the current department chairman of Asian Art since 2011.

Egyptian art 

Though the majority of the Met's initial holdings of Egyptian art came from private collections, items uncovered during the museum's own archeological excavations, carried out between 1906 and 1941, constitute almost half of the current collection. More than 26,000 separate pieces of Egyptian art from the Paleolithic era through the Ptolemaic era constitute the Met's Egyptian collection, and almost all of them are on display in the museum's massive wing of 40 Egyptian galleries. Among the most valuable pieces in the Met's Egyptian collection are 13 wooden models (of the total 24 models found together, 12 models and 1 offering bearer figure is at the Met, while the remaining 10 models and 1 offering bearer figure are in the Egyptian Museum in Cairo), discovered in a tomb in the Southern Asasif in western Thebes in 1920. These models depict, in unparalleled detail, a cross-section of Egyptian life in the early Middle Kingdom: boats, gardens, and scenes of daily life are represented in miniature. William the Faience Hippopotamus is a miniature shown at right.

However, the popular centerpiece of the Egyptian Art department continues to be the Temple of Dendur. Dismantled by the Egyptian government as part of the International Campaign to Save the Monuments of Nubia to save it from rising waters caused by the building of the Aswan High Dam, the large sandstone temple was given to the United States in 1965 and assembled in a new wing at the Met in 1978. Situated in a large room and partially surrounded by a reflecting pool and illuminated by a wall of windows opening onto Central Park, the Temple of Dendur has been one of the Met's most enduring attractions. Among the oldest items at the Met, a set of Archeulian flints from Deir el-Bahri which date from the Lower Paleolithic period (between 300,000 and 75,000 BCE), are part of the Egyptian collection. The first curator was Albert Lythgoe, who directed several Egyptian excavations for the museum. Since 2013 the curator has been Diana Craig Patch.

In 2018, the museum built an exhibition around the golden-sheathed 1st-century BCE coffin of Nedjemankh, a high-ranking priest of the ram-headed god Heryshaf of Heracleopolis. Investigators determined that the artifact had been stolen in 2011 from Egypt, to which the museum has agreed to return it.

European paintings 

The Met's collection of European paintings numbers around 1,700 pieces. The current curator in charge of the European Paintings department is Stephan Wolohojian.

European sculpture and decorative arts 

The European Sculpture and Decorative Arts collection is one of the largest departments at the Met, holding in excess of 50,000 separate pieces from the 15th through the early 20th centuries. Although the collection is particularly concentrated in Renaissance sculpture—much of which can be seen in situ surrounded by contemporary furnishings and decoration—it also contains comprehensive holdings of furniture, jewelry, glass and ceramic pieces, tapestries, textiles, and timepieces and mathematical instruments. In addition to its outstanding collections of English and French furniture, visitors can enter dozens of completely furnished period rooms, transplanted in their entirety into the Met's galleries. The collection even includes an entire 16th-century patio from the Spanish castle of Vélez Blanco, reconstructed in a two-story gallery, and the intarsia studiolo from the ducal palace at Gubbio. Sculptural highlights of the sprawling department include Bernini's Bacchanal, a cast of Rodin's The Burghers of Calais, and several unique pieces by Houdon, including his Bust of Voltaire and his famous portrait of his daughter Sabine.

American Wing 

The museum's collection of American art returned to view in new galleries on January 16, 2012. The new installation provides visitors with the history of American art from the 18th through the early 20th century. The new galleries encompasses  for the display of the museum's collection. The curator in charge of the American Wing since September 2014 is Sylvia Yount.

Greek and Roman art 

The Met's collection of Greek and Roman art contains more than 17,000 objects. The Greek and Roman collection dates back to the founding of the museum—in fact, the museum's first accessioned object was a Roman sarcophagus, still currently on display. Though the collection naturally concentrates on items from ancient Greece and the Roman Empire, these historical regions represent a wide range of cultures and artistic styles, from classic Greek black-figure and red-figure vases to carved Roman tunic pins.

Highlights of the collection include the monumental Amathus sarcophagus and a magnificently detailed Etruscan chariot known as the "Monteleone chariot". The collection also contains many pieces from far earlier than the Greek or Roman empires—among the most remarkable are a collection of early Cycladic sculptures from the mid-third millennium BCE, many so abstract as to seem almost modern.

The Met has a growing corpus of digital assets that expand access to the collection beyond the physical museum. The interactive Met map provides an initial view of the collection as it can be experienced in the physical museum. The Greek and Roman Art department page provides a department overview and links to collection highlights and digital assets. More than 33,000 Greek and Roman objects can be referenced in the  Met Digital Collection via a search engine.

Islamic art 

The Metropolitan Museum owns one of the world's largest collection of works of art of the Islamic world. The collection also includes artifacts and works of art of cultural and secular origin from the time period indicated by the rise of Islam predominantly from the Near East and in contrast to the Ancient Near Eastern collections. The biggest number of miniatures from the "Shahnameh" list prepared under the reign of Shah Tahmasp I, the most luxurious of all the existing Islamic manuscripts, also belongs to this museum. Other rarities include the works of Sultan Muhammad and his associates from the Tabriz school "The Sade Holiday", "Tahmiras kills divs", "Bijan and Manijeh", and many others.

The Met's collection of Islamic art is not confined strictly to religious art, though a significant number of the objects in the Islamic collection were originally created for religious use or as decorative elements in mosques. Much of the 12,000 strong collection consists of secular items, including ceramics and textiles, from Islamic cultures ranging from Spain to North Africa to Central Asia. The Islamic Art department's collection of miniature paintings from Iran and Mughal India are a highlight of the collection. Calligraphy both religious and secular is well represented in the Islamic Art department, from the official decrees of Suleiman the Magnificent to a number of Qur'an manuscripts reflecting different periods and styles of calligraphy. Modern calligraphic artists also used a word or phrase to convey a direct message, or they created compositions from the shapes of Arabic words. Others incorporated indecipherable cursive writing within the body of the work to evoke the illusion of writing.

Islamic Arts galleries had been undergoing refurbishment since 2001 and were reopened on November 1, 2011, as the New Galleries for the Art of the Arab Lands, Turkey, Iran, Central Asia, and Later South Asia. Until that time, a narrow selection of items from the collection had been on temporary display throughout the museum. As with many other departments at the Met, the Islamic Art galleries contain many interior pieces, including the entire reconstructed Nur Al-Din Room from an early 18th-century house in Damascus. However, the museum has confirmed to the New York Post that it has withdrawn from public display all paintings depicting Muhammad and may not rehang those that were displayed in the Islamic gallery before the renovation.

In September 2022 the Met revealed that it had received a substantial gift from Qatar Museums on the occasion of its 10th anniversary of the opening of its Galleries for the Art of the Arab Lands, Turkey, Iran, Central Asia and Later South Asia, which would benefit its Department of Islamic Art and some of the museum's other principal projects. As a token of its appreciation the name Qatar Gallery was adopted for the museum's Gallery of the Umayyad and Abbasid Periods. This followed the announcement that the Met and Qatar Museums had entered into a partnership to foster their exchange with regards to exhibitions, activities, and scholarly cooperation.

Non-geographically designated collections

Arms and Armor 

The Met's Department of Arms and Armor is one of the museum's most popular collections. The distinctive "parade" of armored figures on horseback installed in the first-floor Arms and Armor gallery is one of the most recognizable images of the museum, which was organized in 1975 with the help of the Russian immigrant and arms and armors' scholar, Leonid Tarassuk (1925–90). The department's focus on "outstanding craftsmanship and decoration," including pieces intended solely for display, means that the collection is strongest in late medieval European pieces and Japanese pieces from the 5th through 19th centuries.  However, these are not the only cultures represented in Arms and Armor; the collection spans more geographic regions than almost any other department, including weapons and armor from dynastic Egypt, ancient Greece, the Roman Empire, the ancient Near East, Africa, Oceania, and the Americas, as well as American firearms (especially Colt firearms) from the 19th and 20th centuries. Among the collection's 14,000 objects are the oldest items in the museum: flint bifaces which date to 700,000–200,000 BCE. There are also many pieces made for and used by kings and princes, including armor belonging to Henry VIII of England, Henry II of France, and Ferdinand I, Holy Roman Emperor.

Costume Institute 

The Museum of Costume Art was founded by Aline Bernstein and Irene Lewisohn. In 1946, with the financial support of the fashion industry, the Museum of Costume Art merged with The Metropolitan Museum of Art as The Costume Institute, and in 1959 became a curatorial department. Today, its collection contains more than 35,000 costumes and accessories. The Costume Institute used to have a permanent gallery space in what was known as the "Basement" area of the Met because it was downstairs at the bottom of the Met facility. However, due to the fragile nature of the items in the collection, the Costume Institute does not maintain a permanent installation. Instead, every year it holds two separate shows in the Met's galleries using costumes from its collection, with each show centering on a specific designer or theme. The Costume Institute is known for hosting the annual Met Gala and in the past has presented summer exhibitions such as Savage Beauty and China: Through the Looking Glass.

In past years, Costume Institute shows organized around designers such as Cristóbal Balenciaga, Chanel, Yves Saint Laurent, and Gianni Versace; and style doyenne like Diana Vreeland, Mona von Bismarck, Babe Paley, Jayne Wrightsman, Jacqueline Kennedy Onassis, Nan Kempner, and Iris Apfel have drawn significant crowds to the Met. The Costume Institute's annual Benefit Gala, co-chaired by Vogue editor-in-chief Anna Wintour, is an extremely popular, if exclusive, event in the fashion world; in 2007, the 700 available tickets started at $6,500 per person.
Exhibits displayed over the past decade in the Costume Institute include: Rock Style, in 1999, representing the style of more than 40 rock musicians, including Madonna, David Bowie, and the Beatles; Extreme Beauty: The Body Transformed, in 2001, which exposes the transforming ideas of physical beauty over time and the bodily contortion necessary to accommodate such ideals and fashion; The Chanel Exhibit, displayed in 2005, acknowledging the skilled work of designer Coco Chanel as one of the leading fashion names in history; Superheroes: Fashion and Fantasy, exhibited in 2008, suggesting the metaphorical vision of superheroes as ultimate fashion icons; the 2010 exhibit on the American Woman: Fashioning a National Identity, which exposes the revolutionary styles of the American woman from the years 1890 to 1940, and how such styles reflect the political and social sentiments of the time. The theme of the 2011 event was "Alexander McQueen: Savage Beauty". Each of these exhibits explores fashion as a mirror of cultural values and offers a glimpse into historical styles, emphasizing their evolution into today's own fashion world. On January 14, 2014, the Met named the Costume Institute complex after Anna Wintour. The curator is Andrew Bolton.

Drawings and prints 

Though other departments contain significant numbers of drawings and prints, the Drawings and Prints department specifically concentrates on North American pieces and western European works produced after the Middle Ages. The first Old Master drawings, comprising 670 sheets, were presented as a single group in 1880 by Cornelius Vanderbilt II and in effect launched the department, though it was not formally constituted as a department until later. Other early donors to the department include Junius Spencer Morgan II who presented a broad range of material, but mainly dated from the 16th century, including two woodblocks and many prints by Albrecht Dürer in 1919. Currently, the Drawings and Prints collection contains more than 17,000 drawings, 1.5 million prints, and 12,000 illustrated books. The great masters of European painting, who produced many more sketches and drawings than actual paintings, are extensively represented in the Drawing and Prints collection. The department's holdings contain major drawings by Michelangelo, Leonardo da Vinci and Rembrandt, as well as prints and etchings by Van Dyck, Dürer, and Degas among many others. The curator is Nadine Orenstein.

Robert Lehman Collection 

On the death of banker Robert Lehman in 1969, his Foundation donated 2,600 works of art to the museum. Housed in the "Robert Lehman Wing," the museum refers to the collection as "one of the most extraordinary private art collections ever assembled in the United States". To emphasize the personal nature of the Robert Lehman Collection, the Met housed the collection in a special set of galleries which evoked the interior of Lehman's richly decorated townhouse at 7 West 54th Street. This intentional separation of the Collection as a "museum within the museum" met with mixed criticism and approval at the time, though the acquisition of the collection was seen as a coup for the Met. Unlike other departments at the Met, the Robert Lehman collection does not concentrate on a specific style or period of art; rather, it reflects Lehman's personal interests. Lehman the collector concentrated heavily on paintings of the Italian Renaissance, particularly the Sienese school. Paintings in the collection include masterpieces by Botticelli and Domenico Veneziano, as well as works by a significant number of Spanish painters, El Greco and Goya among them. Lehman's collection of drawings by the Old Masters, featuring works by Rembrandt and Dürer, is particularly valuable for its breadth and quality. Princeton University Press has documented the massive collection in a multi-volume book series published as The Robert Lehman Collection Catalogues.

Medieval art and the Cloisters 

The Met's collection of medieval art consists of a comprehensive range of Western art from the 4th through the early 16th centuries, as well as Byzantine and pre-medieval European antiquities not included in the Ancient Greek and Roman collection. Like the Islamic collection, the Medieval collection contains a broad range of two- and three-dimensional art, with religious objects heavily represented. In total, the Medieval Art department's permanent collection numbers over 10,000 separate objects, divided between the main museum building on Fifth Avenue and The Cloisters.

Main building 
The medieval collection in the main Metropolitan building, centered on the first-floor medieval gallery, contains about 6,000 separate objects. While a great deal of European medieval art is on display in these galleries, most of the European pieces are concentrated at the Cloisters (see below). However, this allows the main galleries to display much of the Met's Byzantine art side by side with European pieces. The main gallery is host to a wide range of tapestries and church and funerary statuary, while side galleries display smaller works of precious metals and ivory, including reliquary pieces and secular items. The main gallery, with its high arched ceiling, also serves double duty as the annual site of the Met's elaborately decorated Christmas tree.

The Cloisters museum and gardens 

The Cloisters was a principal project of John D. Rockefeller, Jr., a major benefactor of the Met. Located in Fort Tryon Park and completed in 1938, it is a separate building dedicated solely to medieval art. The Cloisters collection was originally that of a separate museum, assembled by George Grey Barnard and acquired in toto by Rockefeller in 1925 as a gift to the Met.

The Cloisters are so named on account of the five medieval French cloisters whose salvaged structures were incorporated into the modern building, and the five thousand objects at the Cloisters are strictly limited to medieval European works. The collection features items of outstanding beauty and historical importance; including the Belles Heures of Jean de France, Duc de Berry illustrated by the Limbourg Brothers in 1409, the Romanesque altar cross known as the "Cloisters Cross" or "Bury Cross", and the seven tapestries depicting the Hunt of the Unicorn.

Modern and contemporary art 
With some 13,000 artworks, primarily by European and American artists, the modern art collection occupies , of gallery space and contains many iconic modern works. Cornerstones of the collection include Picasso's portrait of Gertrude Stein, Jasper Johns's White Flag, Jackson Pollock's Autumn Rhythm (Number 30), and Max Beckmann's triptych Beginning. Certain artists are represented in remarkable depth, for a museum whose focus is not exclusively on modern art: for example, ninety works constitute the museum's Paul Klee collection, donated by Heinz Berggruen, spanning the entirety of the artist's life. Due to the Met's long history, "contemporary" paintings acquired in years past have often migrated to other collections at the museum, particularly to the American and European Paintings departments.

In April 2013, it was reported that the museum was to receive a collection worth $1 billion from cosmetics tycoon Leonard Lauder. The collection of Cubist art includes work by Pablo Picasso, Georges Braque and Juan Gris and went on display in 2014. The Met has since added to the collection, for example spending $31.8 million for Gris' The musician's table in 2018.

Musical instruments 

The Met's collection of musical instruments, with about 5,000 examples of musical instruments from all over the world, is virtually unique among major museums. The collection began in 1889 with a donation of 270 instruments by Mary Elizabeth Adams Brown, who joined her collection to become the museum's first curator of musical instruments, named in honor of her husband, John Crosby Brown. By the time she died, the collection had 3,600 instruments that she had donated and the collection was housed in five galleries. Instruments were (and continue to be) included in the collection not only on aesthetic grounds, but also insofar as they embodied technical and social aspects of their cultures of origin. The modern Musical Instruments collection is encyclopedic in scope; every continent is represented at virtually every stage of its musical life. Highlights of the department's collection include several Stradivari violins, a collection of Asian instruments made from precious metals, and the oldest surviving piano, a 1720 model by Bartolomeo Cristofori. Many of the instruments in the collection are playable, and the department encourages their use by holding concerts and demonstrations by guest musicians.

Photographs 

The Met's collection of photographs, numbering more than 25,000 in total, is centered on five major collections plus additional acquisitions by the museum. Alfred Stieglitz, a photographer himself, donated the first major collection of photographs to the museum, which included a comprehensive survey of Photo-Secessionist works, a rich set of master prints by Edward Steichen, and an outstanding collection of Stieglitz's photographs from his own studio. The Met supplemented Stieglitz's gift with the 8,500-piece Gilman Paper Company Collection, the Rubel Collection, and the Ford Motor Company Collection, which respectively provided the collection with early French and American photography, early British photography, and post-WWI American and European photography. The museum also acquired Walker Evans's personal collection of photographs, a particular coup considering the high demand for his works. The department of photography was founded in 1992. Though the department gained a permanent gallery in 1997, not all of the department's holdings are on display at any given time, due to the sensitive materials represented in the photography collection. However, the Photographs department has produced some of the best-received temporary exhibits in the Met's recent past, including a Diane Arbus retrospective and an extensive show devoted to spirit photography. In 2007, the museum designated a gallery exclusively for the exhibition of photographs made after 1960.

Film
The Met has an extensive archive consisting of 1,500 films made and collected by the museum since the 1920s. As part of the museum's 150 anniversary commemoration, since January 2020, the museum uploads a film from its archive weekly onto YouTube.

Digital representation of collections 
Beginning in 2013, the Met organized the Digital Media Department for the purpose of increasing access of the museum's collections and resources using digital media and expanded website services. The first Chief Digital Officer Sree Sreenivasan from 2013 departed in 2016 and was replaced by Loic Tallon at the time that the department became known by its simplified designation as the Digital Department. At the start of 2017, the department began its Open Access initiative summarized on the Met's website titled "Digital Underground" stating: "It's been six months since The Met launched its Open Access initiative, which made available all 375,000+ images of public-domain works in The Met collection under Creative Commons Zero (CC0). During what is just the dawn of this new initiative, the responses so far have been incredible." At that time, more than 375,000 photographic images from the museum's archival collection were released for public domain reproduction and use both by the general public and by large public access websites such as those available at Google BigQuery.

In May 2022, the Met and the World Monuments Fund announced a collaboration of digital work for the 2024 reopening of the African, ancient American, and Oceanic art galleries. The digital project "aims to bolster the understanding of several historic sites in sub-Saharan Africa," in particular sites that have been minimally explored by Western museums.

Open access images and data have been viewed over 1.2 billion times with over 7 million downloads.

Libraries 
Each Department maintains a library, most of the material of which can be requested online through the libraries' catalog. Two of the libraries may be accessed without an appointment:

Thomas J. Watson Library 

The Thomas J. Watson Library is the central library of The Metropolitan Museum of Art, and supports the activities of staff and researchers. Watson Library's collection contains approximately 900,000 volumes, including monographs and exhibition catalogs; over 11,000 periodical titles; and more than 125,000 auction and sale catalogs. The library includes a reference collection, auction and sale catalogs, a rare book collection, manuscript items, and vertical file collections. The library is accessible to anyone 18 years of age or older simply by registering online and providing a valid photo ID.

Nolen Library 
The Nolen Library is open to the general public. The collection of some 8,000 items, arranged in open shelves, includes books, picture books, DVDs, and videos. The Nolen Library includes a children's reading room and materials for teachers.

Special exhibitions 
The museum regularly hosts notable special exhibitions, often focusing on the works of one artist that have been loaned out from a variety of other museums and sources for the duration of the exhibition. These exhibitions are part of the attraction that draw people both within and outside Manhattan to explore the Met. Such exhibitions include displays especially designed for the Costume Institute, paintings from artists from across the world, works of art related to specific art movements, and collections of historical artifacts. Exhibitions are commonly located within their specific departments, ranging from American decorative arts, arms and armor, drawings and prints, Egyptian art, Medieval art, musical instruments, and photographs. Typical exhibitions run for months at a time and are open to the general public. Each exhibition provides insight into the world of art as a transformative, cultural experience and often includes a historical analysis to demonstrate the profound impact that art has on society and its dramatic transformation over the years.

In 1969, a special exhibition, titled "Harlem on My Mind" was criticized for failing to exhibit work by Harlem artists. The museum defended its decision to portray Harlem itself as a work of art. Norman Lewis, Benny Andrews, Romare Bearden, Clifford Joseph, Roy DeCarava, Reginald Gammon, Henri Ghent, Raymond Saunders, and Alice Neel were among the artists who picketed the show.

In America: An Anthology of Fashion

In America: An Anthology of Fashion is the 2022 high fashion art exhibition of the Anna Wintour Costume Center, a wing of the Metropolitan Museum of Art which houses the collection of the Costume Institute. It is the second portion, after In America: A Lexicon of Fashion, of a two-part exhibition on fashion in the United States.

History

19th century
The New York State Legislature granted the Metropolitan Museum of Art an Act of Incorporation on April 13, 1870, "for the purpose of establishing and maintaining in said City a Museum and Library of Art, of encouraging and developing the Study of the Fine Arts, and the application of Art to manufacture and natural life, of advancing the general knowledge of kindred subjects, and to that end of furnishing popular instruction and recreations". This legislation was supplemented later by the 1893 Act, Chapter 476, which required that its collections "shall be kept open and accessible to the public free of all charge throughout the year". The founders included businessmen and financiers, among them Theodore Roosevelt Sr., the father of Theodore Roosevelt, the 26th president of the US, as well as leading artists and thinkers of the day, who wanted to open a museum to bring art and art education to the American people.

The museum first opened on February 20, 1872, housed in a building located at 681 Fifth Avenue. John Taylor Johnston, a railroad executive whose personal art collection seeded the museum, served as its first president, and the publisher George Palmer Putnam came on board as its founding superintendent. The artist Eastman Johnson acted as co-founder of the museum, as did landscape painter Frederic Edwin Church. Various other industrialists, artists, and scientists of the age served as co-founders, including Howard Potter and Salem Howe Wales. The former Civil War officer, Luigi Palma di Cesnola, was named as its first director. He served from 1879 to 1904. Under their guidance, the Met's holdings, initially consisting of a Roman stone sarcophagus and 174 mostly European paintings, quickly outgrew the available space. In 1873, occasioned by the Met's purchase of the Cesnola Collection of Cypriot antiquities, the museum decamped from Fifth Avenue and took up residence at the Mrs. Nicholas Cruger Mansion also known as the Douglas Mansion (James Renwick, 1853–54, demolished 1928) at 128 West 14th Street. However, these new accommodations proved temporary, as the growing collection required more space than the mansion could provide. It moved into the current building in 1880. Between 1879 and 1895, the museum created and operated a series of educational programs, known as the Metropolitan Museum of Art Schools, intended to provide vocational training and classes on fine arts.

20th century

In 1954, to mark the opening of its Grace Rainey Rogers concert hall, the museum inaugurated a series of concerts, adding art lectures in 1956. This "Concerts & Lectures program" grew over the years into 200 events each season. The program presented such performers as Marian Anderson, Cecilia Bartoli, Judy Collins, Marilyn Horne, Burl Ives, Juilliard String Quartet, Yo-Yo Ma, Itzhak Perlman, Artur Rubinstein, András Schiff, Nina Simone, Joan Sutherland and André Watts, as well as lectures on art history, music, dance, theater and social history. The program was directed, from its inception to 1968, by William Kolodney, and from 1969 to 2010, by Hilde Limondjian.

In the 1960s, the governance of the Met was expanded to include, for the first time, a chairman of the board of trustees in contemplation of a large bequest from the estate of Robert Lehman. For six decades Lehman built upon an art collection begun by his father in 1911 and devoted a great deal of time the Met, before finally becoming the first chairman of the board at the Metropolitan in the 1960s. After his death in 1969, the Robert Lehman Foundation donated close to 3,000 works of art to the Metropolitan Museum of Art. Housed in the Robert Lehman Wing, which opened to the public in 1975 and largely financed by the Lehman Foundation, the museum has called it "one of the most extraordinary private art collections ever assembled in the United States".

The Metropolitan Museum of Art Centennial was celebrated with exhibitions, symposia, concerts, lectures, the reopening of refurbished galleries, special tours, social events, and other programming for eighteen months from October 1969 through the spring of 1971. The centennial's events (including an open house, Centennial Ball, year-long art history course for the public, and various educational programming and traveling exhibitions) and publications drew on support from prominent New Yorkers, artists, writers, composers, interior designers, and art historians.

21st century
In 2009 Michael Gross published The Secret History of the Moguls and the Money That Made the Metropolitan Museum, an unauthorized social history, and the museum bookstore declined to sell it.

In 2012, following the earlier appointment of Daniel Brodsky as chairman of the board at the Met, the by-laws of the museum were formally amended to recognize the office of the chairman as having authority over the assignment and review of both the offices of president and director of the museum. The office of chairman was first introduced relatively late in the museum's history in the 1960s in contemplation of the anticipated donation of the Lehman collection to the museum and has since that time, under Brodsky, become the most senior administrative position at the museum.

From 2016 to 2020, the museum operated a modern and contemporary art gallery at 945 Madison Avenue, a Marcel Breuer-designed building at Madison Avenue and 75th Street in Manhattan's Upper East Side, the former Whitney Museum of American Art. It extends the museum's modern and contemporary art program. In September 2018, it was announced that the Met intended to vacate the Met Breuer three years early, in 2020; the Frick Collection began occupying the space (still owned by the Met) while the main building underwent renovations.

In January 2018, museum president Daniel Weiss announced that the century-old policy of free admission would be replaced by a $25 charge to out-of-state and foreign visitors, effective March 2018. The museum temporarily closed in March 2020 during the COVID-19 pandemic in New York City, and reopened in late August; this was the first time in over a century that the Met was closed for more than three consecutive days.

In September 2020, the museum appointed Patricia Marroquin Norby (Purépecha/Nde descent) as the museum's inaugural Associate Curator of Native American Art. In May 2021, the museum installed a plaque on its Fifth Avenue facade in recognition of indigenous communities and of the fact that the museum is situated in what was historically Lenapehoking. That November, the Met received a $125 million donation from Oscar L. Tang and Agnes Hsu-Tang, the largest gift in the museum's history. In exchange, the Met named its modern and contemporary art galleries after the Tangs. The following February, the Met hired Moody Nolan to renovate the Ancient Near Eastern and Cypriot galleries. Mexican architect Frida Escobedo was hired in March 2022 to renovate the Tang wing.

Architecture 

After negotiations with the City of New York in 1871, the Met was granted the land between the East Park Drive, Fifth Avenue, and the 79th and 85th Street transverse roads in Central Park. The first part of the Met to be built was a red-brick and stone "mausoleum" was designed by American architect Calvert Vaux and his collaborator Jacob Wrey Mould. The Fifth Avenue facade, Great Hall, and Grand Stairway were designed in the Beaux-Arts style by Richard Morris Hunt and his son, Richard Howland Hunt, in the late 1890s and early 1900s. The firm of McKim, Mead & White completed the wings on the Fifth Avenue facade in 1910. The modernistic glass sides and rear of the museum are the work of Roche-Dinkeloo.

The museum building is an accretion of over 20 structures, most of which are not visible from the exterior. The City of New York owns the museum building and contributes utilities, heat, and some of the cost of guardianship. The Iris and B. Gerald Cantor Roof Garden is located on the roof near the southwestern corner of the museum. The museum's main building was designated a city landmark by the New York City Landmarks Preservation Commission in 1967, and its interior was separately recognized by the Landmarks Preservation Commission in 1977. The Met's main building was designated a National Historic Landmark in 1986, recognizing both its monumental architecture, and its importance as a cultural institution.

Management

Governance 
Daniel Weiss is the current president and CEO of the Met, replacing Emily K. Rafferty, who served as president for a decade, and Thomas P. Campbell, CEO and director of the museum until resigning in 2017. In April 2018, Max Hollein was named director. The Met announced in August 2022 that Hollein would also become CEO in July 2023.

Board
Although the City of New York owns the museum building and contributes utilities, heat, and some of the cost of guardianship, the collections are owned by a private corporation of fellows and benefactors which totals about 950 people. The museum is governed by a board of trustees of 41 elected members, several officials of the City of New York, and persons honored as trustees by the museum. The current co-chairs of the board, Candace Beinecke and Hamilton E. James, were elected in 2021. Other notable trustees include Anna Wintour, Richard Chilton, Candace Beinecke, Alejandro Santo Domingo, as well as former New York City mayor Bill de Blasio, and his appointee Ken Sunshine.

The activities of board of trustees are organized and based upon the activities of the individual trustees and their various committees as of 2016. The several committees of the board of trustees include the committees listed as Nominating, Executive, Acquisitions, Finance, Investment, Legal, Education, Audit, Employee Benefits, External Affairs, Merchandising, Membership, Building, Technology, and The Fund for the Met.

Finances 
As of 2021, the museum's endowment as administered by the museum's new investment officer Lauren Meserve is US$3.3 billion which provides much of the income for operations while admissions account for only 13 percent of revenue as of fiscal 2016. The 2009–10 operating budget was $221 million. The museum admission price as of March 2018 is $25 for out-of-state and foreign visitors, while New York state residents can pay what they wish to enter. Although subject to re-assessment, a 1970 agreement between the museum and the city of New York requires New York state visitors to pay at least a nominal amount; a penny is acceptable. The Met's finance committee is led by Hamilton E. James of The Blackstone Group, who is also one of the board members at the Met. The Met is reported to have an Aaa credit rating, the highest such rating possible. This was last affirmed by Moody's in 2015.

In 2019, museum president Daniel Weiss announced that the institution would review its policy for receiving financial donations, under pressure from activist group P.A.I.N. for the role that cultural institutions have played in whitewashing the Sackler family by receiving their donations. The museum announced it would remove the Sackler name from locations within the museum in December 2021.

2015–2018 setbacks 
In September 2016, the Wall Street Journal first reported financial set-backs at the museum related to servicing its outstanding debts and associated cut-backs in staffing at the museum, with the goal of trying to balance its budget by fiscal year 2018. According to the Met's annual tax filing for fiscal year 2016, several top executives had received disproportionately high compensation, often exceeding $1 million per annum with over $100,000 bonuses per annum.

In April 2017, The New York Times reported that the Met's annual debt was approaching $40 million, in addition to an outstanding museum bond for $250 million. This resulted in the indefinite postponement of a planned $600 million architectural expansion of the exhibition space for the museum's modern art collection as well as started a general discussion over the Met's human resources management. The chairman of the board at the Met elected in 2011, Daniel Brodsky, stated in response to the Times reports that he "looked forward to working with my administrative and board colleagues to support a climate of candor, transparency, accountability and mutual respect". In January 2018, Daniel Weiss as president of the museum stated that a downsized version of the original $600 million architectural expansion might be reconsidered as early as 2020 at a reduction to the $450 million level.

Brodsky, the chairman of the Met, stated that after the 2017 financial setbacks, the director position would be appointed separately from the position of CEO. Following a commissioned report from the Boston Consulting Group, the interim CEO, president, and COO of the Met, Daniel Weiss, said that the Met's 2015–2017 financial setbacks were caused by "slowing revenue, rising costs, and too many projects at once". Weiss was further reported as having hired Will Manzer, formerly an executive at Perry Ellis, to help re-invigorate recently declining revenues at the museum. On April 26, Weiss stated that the budget shortfall of $15 million might require a re-assessment and increase in the museum's current admission payment policy. Weiss added that there remained concerns for a sustainable fiscal model for the Met in which city officials "have a right to a clear understanding of how we would be engaging the public, how we balance access with sustainability". In May 2017, the Met filed formal proposal to attempt to charge admission fees to out-of-state visitors. Robin Pogrebin, writing for the Times, reported that the request for out-of-state admissions would call for the re-legislation of the New York State 1893 Act which requires that the museum's collections "shall be kept open and accessible to the public free of all charge throughout the year," and any unlegislated changes would be subject to challenge by the New York State attorney general, Eric Schneiderman, or one of the tristate counselors, Christopher Porrino or George Jepsen.

In January 2018, Pogrebin writing for The New York Times reported that amid-continuing reverberations from "a period of financial turbulence and leadership turmoil" that the museum president Daniel Weiss had announced that the museum would rescind its century-old policy of free admission to the museum and begin charging $25 for out-of-state visitors starting in March 2018. Pogrebin stated that although the museum had made progress in decreasing its deficit from $40 million to $10 million, that an adverse decision from the City of New York to curtail funding for the Met's operating costs by as much as $8 million "for security and building staff" caused Weiss to announce the change in admissions policy. Weiss indicated that the new policy would be estimated to increase revenue from the current $43 million it receives from admissions to an enhanced revenue stream as high as US$49 million.

Attendance 
For the fiscal year 2017 which ended on June 30, the museum was reported as having 7 million visitors during the past year, where "37 percent of these were international visitors, while 30 percent came from New York's five boroughs." Previously in 2016, the museum set a record for attendance, attracting 6.7 million visitors—the highest number since the museum began tracking admissions. Forty percent of the Met's visitors in fiscal year 2016 came from New York City and the tristate area; 41 percent from 190 countries besides the United States. In 2017, the attendance figures indicated seven million annual visitors with 63% of the visitors arriving from outside of New York State.

Roberta Smith writing for The New York Times in September 2017 voiced growing public concern that proposed increases in admissions costs would have an adverse effect upon attendance statistics at the museum. Smith referred to the public perception that such costs would appear "greedy and inappropriate" because "The museum already gets around $39 million a year from its gate—equal to the entire annual budget of the Brooklyn Museum." Smith's article continued to report the negative response of local communities in the tristate area surrounding the museum which was previously introduced in a series of articles by Robin Pogrebin written during the 2016–2017 fiscal year at the museum which criticized speculative suggestions among current administrators at the museum that an added revenue stream could be pursued by the museum by rescinding existing museum policy since 1893 allowing for free public access to the museum. In January 2018, museum president Daniel Weiss announced that the century-old policy of free museum admission would be replaced. Effective March 2018, most visitors who do not live in New York state or are not a student from New York, New Jersey, or Connecticut have to pay $25 to enter the museum. The City of New York has reduced funding at the Metropolitan as part of Mayor De Blasio's political effort to increase artistic diversity. They made an agreement to allow the fees in exchange for less funding which the city pledged to use at alternate facilities and promote diversity.

Holland Carter and Roberta Smith of The New York Times argued in response to Weiss's decision to rescind the previous free admission policy as lacking in responsible fiscal planning.  They stated that a recent $65 million expenditure for renovating fountains seemed to be a poor allocation of the limited available funding. Smith added, "Those new awful Darth Vaderish fountains take huge chunks out of the plaza and disrupt movement," as an indication of the misuse of funds. Further criticism of Weiss's proposal was voiced internationally when The Guardian summarized the backlash from the Weiss proposal for raising the admissions fees. It stated, "Some critics are outraged. The past week has seen a New York Times piece titled "The New Pay Policy Is a Mistake", while Jezebel's Aimée Lutkin claimed "The Met Should Be Fucking Free". The New York Post writes that the museum has never had the right to charge admission and Alexandra Schwartz in the New Yorker says the new policy diminishes New York City".

Impact of the COVID-19 pandemic (2020-2021)
In early 2020, COVID-19 pandemic was greatly impacted the Met's operations and led to the museum's first long-term shutdown on March 13. The Met gradually partially reopened in stages.  By 2021, the public could visit the Met five days a week, with reduced hours of operation, and visitors were required to wear masks and practice social distancing. Several special exhibits were opened to the public during the reduced hours.  There were 6,479,548 visitors in 2019, compared to 1,124,759 in 2020. However, in 2021, the museum attracted 1,958,000 visitors, ranking fourth on the list of most-visited art museums in the world.

Other services such as the research libraries were almost completely closed except for off-site digital access. As a result, 20 percent of staff positions were eliminated, and Met director Max Hollein indicated that the Met might deaccession and sell off some of its collection to make up financial shortfalls. At least some of the museum's large art holding was placed in storage in order to make-up for losses in revenue causes by responses to the pandemic.

Acquisitions and deaccessioning 

The Metropolitan Museum of Art spent $39 million to acquire art for the fiscal year ending in June 2012. At the same time, the museum is required to list in its annual report the total cash proceeds from art sales each year and to itemize any deaccessioned objects valued at more than $50,000 each. It must also sell those pieces at auction and provide advance public notice of a work being sold if it has been on view in the last ten years. These rules were imposed by the New York State Attorney General in 1972.

During the 1970s, under the directorship of Thomas Hoving, the Met revised its deaccessioning policy. Under the new policy, the Met set its sights on acquiring "world-class" pieces, regularly funding the purchases by selling mid- to high-value items from its collection. Though the Met had always sold duplicate or minor items from its collection to fund the acquisition of new pieces, the Met's new policy was significantly more aggressive and wide-ranging than before, and allowed the deaccessioning of items with higher values which would normally have precluded their sale. The new policy provoked a great deal of criticism (in particular, from The New York Times) but had its intended effect.

Many of the items then purchased with funds generated by the more liberal deaccessioning policy are now considered the "stars" of the Met's collection, including Diego Velázquez's c. 1650 Portrait of Juan de Pareja and the Euphronios Krater depicting the death of Sarpedon (which was repatriated to Italy in 2006). In the years since the Met began its new deaccessioning policy, other museums have begun to emulate it with aggressive deaccessioning programs of their own. The Met has continued the policy in recent years, selling such valuable pieces as Edward Steichen's 1904 photograph The Pond-Moonlight (of which another copy was already in the Met's collection) for a record price of $2.9 million.

One of the most serious challenges to the Metropolitan Museum's reputation has been a series of allegations and lawsuits about its status as an institutional buyer of looted and stolen antiquities. Since the 1990s the Met has been the subject of numerous investigative reports and books critical of the Met's laissez-faire attitude to acquisition. The Met has lost several major lawsuits, notably against the governments of Italy and Turkey, which successfully sought the repatriation of hundreds of ancient Mediterranean and Middle Eastern antiquities, with a total value in the hundreds of millions of dollars. In August 2022, it was reported that the Cambodian government was pressuring the museum to return Khmer artifacts that were allegedly looted during civil war and the tumultuous period following. In September 2022, law enforcement seized 27 artifacts highlighting ancient Rome, Greece, and Egypt, with the intention of returning them to Italy and Egypt.

Selected objects

Selected paintings

See also 
 List of most-visited art museums
 List of most-visited museums in the United States

References

Footnotes

Citations

Sources 

 Danziger, Danny (2007). Museum: Behind the Scenes at the Metropolitan Museum of Art. New York: Viking. .
 Howe, Winifred E., and Henry Watson Kent (2009). A History of the Metropolitan Museum of Art. Vol. 1. General Books, Memphis. .
 Tompkins, Calvin (1989). Merchants & Masterpieces: The Story of the Metropolitan Museum of Art. Henry Holt and Company, New York. .
 Trask, Jeffrey (2012). Things American: Art Museums and Civic Culture in the Progressive Era. University of Pennsylvania Press, Philadelphia. ; A history that relates it the political context of the Progressive Era.

Further reading 
 Vogel, Carol, "Grand Galleries for National Treasures", January 5; and Holland Cotter, "The Met Reimagines the American Story", review, January 15; two 2012 New York Times articles about American painting and sculpture galleries reopening after four-year renovation.

External links 

 
 The Metropolitan Museum of Art presents a Timeline of Art History
 Chronological list of special exhibitions at the Metropolitan Museum of Art
 Digital Collections from the Metropolitan Museum of Art Libraries
 Watsonline: The Catalog of the Libraries of The Metropolitan Museum of Art
 Metropolitan Museum of Art Digital Collections (annual reports, collection catalogs, exhibit catalogs, etc.)
 Artwork owned by The Metropolitan Museum of Art
 
 Metropolitan Museum of Art at Wikipedia's GLAM initiative
 Virtual tour of the Metropolitan Museum of Art provided by Google Arts & Culture

 
1872 establishments in New York (state)
African art museums in the United States
Armour collections
Art museums and galleries in New York City
Art museums established in 1870
Art museums established in 1872
Asian art museums in New York (state)
Egyptological collections in the United States
Fashion museums in the United States
Institutions accredited by the American Alliance of Museums
Modern art museums in the United States
Museums in Manhattan
Museums of American art
Museums of ancient Greece in the United States
Museums of Ancient Near East in the United States
Museums of ancient Rome in the United States
Musical instrument museums in the United States
Musical instrument museums
Order of Arts and Letters of Spain recipients
Pre-Columbian art museums in the United States
Rockefeller family
Textile museums in the United States